Ou Sampoar  is a khum (commune) of Malai District in Banteay Meanchey Province in north-western Cambodia.

Villages

 Ou Sampoar Moy
 Ou Sampoar Pi
 Kbal Tomnob
 Bantey Tipi

References

Communes of Banteay Meanchey province
Malai District